March Upcountry is the first novel in the science fiction series of the Empire of Man by David Weber and John Ringo.  It tells the story of Prince Roger MacClintock and his bodyguards of the Empress' Own Regiment who get marooned on the alien planet of Marduk due to an act of sabotage on their ship and must fight their way towards the local space port (held by enemies of the Terran Empire) in order to get back home to Earth. The book appeared on the New York Times best seller list.

Characters

Prince Roger MacClintock is the youngest child of Empress Alexandra VII, ruler of the Empire of Man, from her second consort Lazar Fillipo, the Earl of New Madrid. A handsome and tall 22-year-old, Roger is poorly regarded by almost everyone except his valet, Kostas Matsugae.
Captain Armand Pahner is the commander of Bravo Company, Bronze Battalion of the Empress's Own Regiment, the elite bodyguards who protect the royal family.
D'nall Cord is a Shaman in his tribe, the X'Intai, the first society Roger and his marines encounter on Marduk.
D'nall Denat is one of Cord's nephews.
Eleonora O'Casey is Roger's chief of staff and former tutor, who holds multiple doctorates in sociology, political sciences and human history.
Kostas Matsugae is Roger's valet and manservant who becomes the company's caravan chief.
Eva Kosutic is the senior NCO in Bravo Company and an extremely competent and experienced combat veteran. A native of the planet Armagh, Kosutic is an Armagh-Satanist High Priestess.
Julio Poertena is the armorer for Bravo Company, a native of the planet Pinopa from a non-English speaking household.
Adib Julian is one of the senior NCOs in the company and the former company armorer.
Nimashet Despreaux is a squad commander in Bravo company. She is beautiful and vulnerable yet also tough and very dangerous.
Warrant Officer Mike "Doc" Dobresceau is one of the shuttle pilots who land the company on Marduk.
Mark & John St. John are identical twins who serve in Bravo Company, with John being the hard-working, smart and capable NCO and Mark being the fighter.
Empress Alexandra VII is the ruler of the Empire of Man and Roger's mother. Their relationship is strained due to Roger's similarity in appearance and behaviour to his hated father.
Xiya Kan is king of the city-state Q'Nkok, the first city the Marines visit on Marduk. King Xyia is a moderate ruler who is forced to contend with an endless number of plots directed against him.
T'Leen Targ is a Voitanese veteran of the Kranolta wars and a weapons dealer in Q'Nkok.
Radj Hoomas is king of the city-state of Marshad, and an extremely ambitious and devious individual.
Kheder Bijan is the head of the Marshad secret police and a self-proclaimed "tinker".
T'Leen Sena is a female "intelligence operative" in Marshad.
Dogzard is a pet Roger picks up at Cord's village.
Patty is one of the flar-ta pack animals the company employs, which Roger uses as a war steed. Roger gives her this human name since she reminds him of a "Patricia" he once knew in boarding school.

Plot summary
Prince Roger is ordered by his mother and older half-brother to attend a ceremony in Leviathan. Roger travels on the spaceship Charles DeGlopper with Eleanora O'Casey, Kostas Matsugae, and Captain Vil Krasnitsky. During the trip, a sentry is discovered shot dead on the ship, and Sergeant-Major Eva Kosutic then discovers charges in the main plasma conduits. Kosutic catches the ship's logistics officer, Ensign Guha, and shoots her just before the charges are detonated. As a result, the ship is forced to land in the nearest star system, Marduk.

Prince Roger and his body guards escape in shuttles hoping to land on the planet and capture the space port. The shuttles eventually land further from the port than planned and Bravo Company sets out on their long journey. The company reach a jungle and D'Nall Cord, a shaman of the X'Intai people, suddenly appears from the jungle. He decides to introduce them to his tribe. While in the village, Cord and Delkra (the tribal chief) consult with Roger, Pahner and O'Casey on a serious problem facing the tribe from the city-state of Q'Nkok.  The city and the X'Intai have a treaty whereby the city dwellers are permitted to cut only certain trees in a specific area of the tribe's territory. In recent months the woodcutters have been cutting deeper into the jungle than permitted. To attack the woodcutters would create war. The tribe could launch a surprise attack on Q'Nkok and feast on their food stores, but Pahner requests that they delay attacking Q'Nkok until after the company has gone there.

The company proceeds to Q'Nkok.  They are brought before the King Xiya Kan and state their need for supplies in exchange for hi-tech tools.  The company arrange to eavesdrop on the king's council and hear him attack them for their continued misconduct.  The company bugs all the great houses to discover who is involved and the marines discover that three of the great houses are conspiring to topple the king.  The marines and the king's guards assault the Great Houses' homes and afterwards the company and the marines set forth into Kranolta territory. As Kranolta hunters ambush the company repeatedly, Sergeant Cobedra is killed. Meanwhile, the Kranolta assemble all of their tribes and decide to attack the human invaders.  They strike and the company is forced to try to get to the walls of the city.

The next day, the Kranolta approach the Citadel. Suddenly, a new force emerges from the jungle which assault the Kranolta's remaining forces. The reduced company depart from Voitan and continue to march until they reach Marshad. They arrive at the king's palace. Later, Lt. Jasco, Kosutic, Julian, Poertena and Denat meet in the kitchen and witness a wall opening up to reveal Kheder Bijan.  Kheder tells the humans that King Radj will have to send his entire army to destroy them. Kheder says that there are factions in Marshad in league with Pasule. All the marines need to do is to attack the army. On the morning of the battle, the marines set off to the battle field. The plasma cannon is hauled to the top of a hill and the bridge explodes and breaks. Three days after the battle, Roger meets with Kheder Bijan, who is the new king of Marshad and inquires as to the delay in giving them the supplies and shields that were promised.  However, after getting in a conflict with Kheder, Roger shoots him. 

T'Leen establishes a more rational regime, redistributing the land and dedicating more of it to food production. Roger then mounts the flar-ta Patty and gives to order to continue the march towards the mountains.

Locations on Marduk Visited by the Marines

Q'Nkok - The first city-state that Roger and Bravo Company visit along the March.  Like most Mardukan cities and villages it is located on a hill top to avoid flash floods.  The city is ruled by King Xiya Kan and a council composed of the heads of all the great houses.  While king is charged with protecting the city and ruling it the council is rife with intrigue and political backstabbing and a serious thorn in the king's side.

Voitan - Once the shining commercial and industrial center of the Hurtan region, known for its superior metal works and Damascene Steel, the city of Voitan found itself overwhelmed by the barbarian tribes of the Kranolta who had sacked the city and the surrounding city-states and occupied the region.  However, the sacking of the city-states was not as complete as the Kranolta had thought as many of the cities artisans and workers along with their wealth had fled the city and established themselves elsewhere preparing for the day that they might retake the city.  As a youth, D'Nal Cord was sent to study in Voitan.

Marshad - Radj Kordan, who had been king during the fall of Voitan, had found himself facing a rebellion among the great houses.  After emerging victorious, he planned to strip them of their guards, fine them heavily and reduce their power, but was assassinated before he could do this.  In retaliation, his son killed every member of the rebellious houses and absorbed his single remaining ally, thus leaving the House of Radj the only power in the city.  Since then the city has fallen into ruin with crushing poverty everywhere except in the king's palace with all of the city's revenues from the lucrative trading dianda (a flax-like silk which is planted everywhere around the city at the expense of food) going towards defense (retaining many mercenaries) and lining the pockets of the king and his advisors while the peasants starve.  The city's closest neighbor is the city-state Pasule which lives in constant fear of Marshad and its king.

Major interstellar players

The Empire of Man - Also called the Terran Empire, it is one of the major interstellar powers in the area of the galaxy explored by humans.  Ruled by a monarchy (house MacClintock) and a parliament consisting of an elected senate and a house of lords, the empire encompasses a great many worlds with varying degrees of technological development.  Recent political problems, beginning with the reign of Emperor Andrew (Roger's grandfather), have created a great deal of factionalism, unrest and inequality, particularly between the core worlds and the outer planets.  The result is a brewing crisis that the Empress has been desperately attempting to prevent and which is the cause of the attack on Roger that strands him and his marines on Marduk.

The Caravazan Empire - The Terran Empire's traditional enemy.  Following the ascent of Pierpaelo Cavaza - a devotee of the Church of Ryback (an organization dedicated to removing "humanocentric" damage from the universe) - to the throne shortly after the Dagger Years, the empire embraced the tenets of the church into law.  The move had triggered a short civil war that Cavaza had won proving that he was just as ruthless as his ancestors.  Now the empire is led by his followers, religious eco-freaks who seek to impose their belief on how nature should be handled.  As part of this belief system, the Saints "reclaim" certain worlds by forcing humans to remove all human influence and pollution (including their own waste - which is why they basically starve the people sent to reclaim these worlds to death).

Raiden-Winterhowe - A revanchist empire that was once invaded and forced to defend itself and now continues to expand because it simply can't stop.

The Alphane Alliance - An alliance consisting of 12 worlds and populated by humans, Althari and Phaenurs.  The Althari are a female-dominated, stoic warrior race that resemble 3 meter tall koala bears while the Phaenurs are a four-legged, lizard-like race of functional telepaths (among themselves) and empaths.  The Althari, being descended from ground burrowing creatures prefer underground dwellings with clear fields of fire, making them more like subterranean bunkers than homes.  In Althari society, males are definitely second-class citizens, untrusted by the females, many of whom consider them as being useful only for breeding and housework.  Defined by O'Casey as "very shrewd bargainers" since they can't be lied to (the Phaenurs being able to sense deception).  The Alliance is on friendly terms with the Empire of Man.

Technology

Tutorial Implants ("Toots") - An implanted computer processor that interfaces completely with human neural systems without adverse side effects.  Used primarily for data processing, storage and training, the toot augments a persons learning capability, including the use of assassination programs (for better marksmanship) or translating alien languages.  The device can, in fact, take over for the person and allow him to perform tasks more efficiently.  However, it is a security planner's nightmare, as the toot can be hacked and the person forced to do a task against their will (as if they'd been possessed by a demon).  People whose toots have been hacked are called "toot zombies" or "toombies".

ChromSten - The hardest substance known to modern science, a form of collapsed matter, used both in ship's armor and in personal body armor.  Only a plasma rifle (or something stronger) can penetrate ChromSten.

Tunnel Drive - The faster-than-light method of transport used for interstellar travel.  Ships equipped with tunnel drives tend to be huge, as the drive takes up a lot of volume.  Every star system, depending on the size of its primary star, has a limit within which entry into tunnel space is impossible (known as the Tsukayama Limit).  Travel between star systems takes days and sometimes weeks.

Phase Drive - The drive used when the ship is in normal space.

Bead Rifles and Cannons - Projectile weapons that fire five-millimeter steel-coated, glass- or tungsten-cored beads "accelerated to phenomenal speeds" via electromagnetic lining in the weapon's barrel.

Plasma Rifles and Cannons - The main field energy weapon, capable of taking out powered armor.  The plasma rifles utilize a magazine containing lithium-deuteride pellets and a power source to feed the laser compressors that initiate the fusion reaction that drives the weapon.

Chameleon Suits - The standard issue marine uniform that allows the wearer to fade into the background.  The suits also offer limited ballistic protection and can be configured for work in vacuum environments.

Powered Armor - ChromSten made armor that offers even better ballistic protection and camouflage capabilities that chameleon suits and are susceptible to damage only from heavy energy weapons such as plasma rifles and cannons or the last-ditch, contact-range weapon called a "one-shot", which delivers a shock wave through the armor to the plasteel matrix supporting it, causing a scab to break free and ricochetted inside the armor, killing the person inside.

Nanotechnology - Widely used throughout the story and in many ways.  Prince Roger, his staff, the marines and the navy personnel attached all have nannites floating around in their blood stream whose function is to enhance the person's regenerative capabilities (even a lost limb, though this takes a metabolic toll on the body), process alien nutrients into something human anatomy can use, increase the body's endurance and protect against disease and foreign toxins.  The marines also have nanotech recording devices used in an intelligence gathering function.  These devices are the size of a small insect and can move like one so as to look innocuous.

References

External links
 The complete text of March Upcountry can be found here.

2001 American novels
2001 science fiction novels
American science fiction novels
Baen Books available as e-books
Novels by David Weber